Arno Krabman (born 19 March 1982) is a Dutch songwriter and producer. He is known for his work with, among others, Suzan & Freek, Snelle and S10, and has had over twenty-five Dutch Single Top 100 hits as a songwriter. His repertoire consists mainly of Dutch-language pop songs.

Early life and education 
Krabman was born on 19 March 1982 in Leeuwarden, Friesland. He studied Music and Technology at the Utrecht School of the Arts in Hilversum. During his studies, he worked as a session musician. Brendan O'Brien and Max Martin have been cited as Krabman's main artistic influences.

Career 
Krabman's first release as a songwriter was the single "" by Maud Mulder in 2005. He also created the soundtrack for the Dutch drama series The Spectacular, which was released in early 2022.

Krabman has scored number-one hits in the Netherlands with the singles "" (2019) by Suzan & Freek, "" (2021) by Snelle & Maan, and "" (2022) by S10. The song "" (2020) by Jaap Reesema & Pommelien Thijs reached number one in both the Netherlands and Belgium.

In 2018, Krabman was a member of the Dutch jury for the Eurovision Song Contest 2018. In 2021, the song "", which Krabman had co-written with Stien den Hollander, was internally selected by the Dutch broadcaster AVROTROS to represent the Netherlands in the Eurovision Song Contest 2022. By finishing in second place in the first semi-final on 10 May 2022, it became the first Dutch-language entry to reach the final of the Eurovision Song Contest since the introduction of the semi-finals in 2004. In the final on 14 May 2022, the entry finished in 11th place with 171 points.

Personal life 
Krabman is in a relationship with Nienke de Jong, who was the lead singer of the metal band Autumn from 1999 to 2008.  They own a recording studio in Wijdemeren, North Holland, located between the villages Kortenhoef and 's-Graveland.

Songwriting discography

Charting singles

Eurovision Song Contest entries

entries

References 

1982 births
21st-century Dutch composers
21st-century Dutch male musicians
Dutch composers
Dutch guitarists
Dutch record producers
Dutch session musicians
Dutch songwriters
Living people
Musicians from Friesland
Musicians from North Holland
People from Leeuwarden
People from Wijdemeren
Utrecht School of the Arts alumni